The Städel, officially the Städelsches Kunstinstitut und Städtische Galerie, is an art museum in Frankfurt, with one of the most important collections in Germany. The Städel Museum owns 3,100 paintings, 660 sculptures, more than 4,600 photographs and more than 100,000 drawings and prints.

In the same year the museum recorded the highest attendance figures in its history, of  447,395 visitors. In 2020 the museum had 318,732 visitors, down 45 percent from 2019, due to the COVID-19 pandemic. It ranked 71st on the list of most-visited art museums in 2020.

History 
The Städel was founded in 1817, and is one of the oldest museums in Frankfurt's Museumsufer, or museum embankment. The founding followed a bequest by the Frankfurt banker and art patron Johann Friedrich Städel (1728–1816), who left his house, art collection and fortune with the request in his will that the institute be set up. In the early years, Städel's former living quarters at Frankfurt's  were used to present his collection.

Building

World War II 

In 1937, 77 paintings and 700 prints were confiscated from the museum when the National Socialists declared them "degenerate art".

In 1939, the collection was moved out of Frankfurt to protect it from damage in World War II. The collection of the Städel Museum was removed from the museum to avoid destruction from the Allied bombings, and the collection was stored in the Schloss Rossbach, a castle owned by the Baron Thüngen near Bad Brückenau in Bavaria. There, the museum's paintings and library were discovered by Lt. Thomas Carr Howe, USN, of the American Monuments, Fine Arts and Archives program. Although the Baron von Thüngen and his wife were uncooperative with the Americans, Frau Dr. Holzinger, a licensed physician and the Swiss wife of the Städel Museum director, was present at the site and assisted with the cataloging and the removal of the items to the Munich Central Collecting Point. Lt. Howe said, "The first room to be inspected was a library adjoining the sitting room in which we had been waiting. Here we found a quantity of excellent French Impressionist paintings, all from the permanent collection of the Städel Museum, and a considerable number of fine Old Master drawings. Most of these were likewise the property of the museum, but a few – I remember one superb Rembrandt sketch – appeared to have come from Switzerland. Those would, of course, have to be looked into later, to determine their exact origin and how they came to be on loan to the museum. But for the moment we were concerned primarily with storage conditions and the problem of security. In another room we found an enormous collection of books, the library of one of the Frankfurt museums. In a third we encountered an array of medieval sculpture – saints all sizes and description, some of carved wood, others of stone, plain or polychromed. These too, were of museum origin. The last storage room was below ground, a vast, cavernous chamber beneath the house. Here was row upon row of pictures, stacked in two tiers down the center of the room and also along two sides. From what we could make of them in the poor light, they were not of high quality. During the summer months they would be alright in the underground room, but we thought the place would be very damp in the winter. Frau Holzinger assured us that this was so and that the pictures should be removed before the bad weather set in."

Renovations and extensions 

The gallery was substantially damaged by air raids in World War II and it was rebuilt by 1966 following a design by the Frankfurt architect Johannes Krahn. An expansion building for the display of 20th-century work and special exhibits was erected in 1990, designed by the Austrian architect Gustav Peichl. Small structural changes and renovations took place from 1997 to 1999.

The largest extension in the history of the museum to  intended for the presentation of contemporary art was designed by the Frankfurt architectural firm  and opened in February 2012.

Digital expansion 
The Städel has been significantly enlarging its activities and outreach through a major digital expansion on the occasion of its 200-year anniversary in 2015. Already available to visitors is an exhibition 'digitorial' and free access to WiFi throughout the museum and its grounds. From March the museum will offer to visitors a new Städel app, the possibility of listening to audio guides on their own devices, and a new 'cabinet of digital curiosities'. Several more projects are currently in development including an online exhibition platform; educational computer games for children; online art-history courses and a digital art book.

Creative commons 
The Städel Museum made more than 22,000 works in its Digital Collection available for free downloading under the Creative Commons licence CC BY-SA 4.0.

Collection 

The Städel has European paintings from seven centuries, beginning with the early 14th century, moving into Late Gothic, the Renaissance, Baroque, and into the 19th, 20th and 21st centuries. The large collection of prints and drawings is not on permanent display and occupies the first floor of the museum. Works on paper not on display can be viewed by appointment.

The gallery has a conservation department that performs conservation and restoration work on the collection.

Temporary exhibitions
Most visited exhibitions:
 "Making Van Gogh" 2019/2020 (505,750 visitors)
 "Monet und die Geburt des Impressionismus" 2015 (432,121 visitors)
 "Botticelli" 2009/2010 (367,033 visitors)
 "Dürer. Kunst – Künstler – Kontext" 2013/2014 (258,577 visitors)

Selected works

 Robert Campin, Flémalle Panels,  1428–1430, mixed technique, 160.2 × 68.2 cm, 151.8 × 61 cm, 148.7 × 61 cm
 Jan van Eyck, Lucca Madonna,  1437, mixed technique, 66 x 50 cm
 Fra Angelico, 1430–1433, tempera on panel, 37 x 27 cm
 Rogier van der Weyden, Medici Madonna,  1460–1464, oil on panel, 61.7 x 46.1 cm
 Master of the Frankfurt Paradiesgärtlein, Paradiesgärtlein, between 1400 and 1420, mixed technique on oak, 26 x 33 cm
 Hieronymus Bosch, Ecce Homo,  1476, oil on panel, 75 x 61 cm
 Sandro Botticelli, Portrait of a Young Woman, 1480–85, mixed technique on a poplar panel, 82 x 54 cm
 Bartolomeo Veneto, Portrait of a Young Woman, between 1500 and 1530, mixed technique on a poplar panel, 44 x 34 cm
 Rembrandt van Rijn, The Blinding of Samson, 1636, oil on canvas, 205 x 272 cm
 Johannes Vermeer, The Geographer, 1668–1669, oil on canvas, 52 x 45.5 cm
 Johann Heinrich Wilhelm Tischbein, Goethe in the Roman Campagna, 1787, oil on canvas, 164 x 206 cm
 Claude Monet, The Luncheon, 1868–1869, oil on canvas, 231.5 x 151.5 cm
 Edgar Degas, 1872, oil on canvas, 69 x 49 cm
 Auguste Renoir, After the Luncheon, 1879, oil on canvas, 100.5 x 81.3 cm
 Franz Marc, Dog Lying in the Snow ,  1911, oil on canvas, 62.5 x 105 cm

The museum also features works by the 20th-century German artist Max Beckmann, who taught at the Städelschule.

Gallery

Directors 
The directors of the Städel Museum:

 Carl Friedrich Wendelstadt 1817–1840
 Philipp Veit 1830–1843
 Johann David Passavant 1840–1861
 Gerhard Malß 1861–1885
 Georg Kohlbacher 1885–1889
 Henry Thode 1889–1891
  1891–1904
 Ludwig Justi 1904–1905
 Georg Swarzenski 1906–1937
 Ernst Holzinger 1938–1972
 Klaus Gallwitz 1974–1994
 Herbert Beck 1994–2006
 Max Hollein 2006–2016
  since 2016

Museumsufer 
Städel is part of the Museumsufer.

See also 
 Städelschule
 List of museums in Germany
 List of art museums
 Dresden Gallery, Alte Pinakothek Munich, Altes Museum Berlin

Literature

Notes

References

Further reading

External links 

 
 
 
 
 Virtual tour of the Städel provided by Google Arts & Culture
 

1818 establishments in Germany
Art museums and galleries in Germany
Museums in Frankfurt
Art museums established in 1818
Städel
Renaissance Revival architecture in Germany